Akropolis Vilnius Curling Cup – international curling tournament, held every year in Lithuania's capital city of Vilnius. Competition started at 2005.

Results

References 
Results

External links 
LKA official website

Curling in Lithuania
International curling competitions
Annual sporting events in Lithuania
Sport in Vilnius
2005 establishments in Lithuania
Recurring sporting events established in 2005